Gapparodus is an extinct genus of conodonts in the family  Furnishinidae. Gapparodus gapparites is a species of the  Early Cambrian of Shuijingtuo Formation in China.

References

External links 

 
 

Paraconodontida
Conodont genera
Cambrian conodonts
Paleozoic life of Nova Scotia

Cambrian genus extinctions